Shield-X Technology Inc. is a developer and manufacturer of impact-diverting technology. Shield-X's decal, is designed to enhance helmet performance in contact sports and activities where traumatic brain injury (TBI) such as concussions occur, including American football, ice hockey, and cycling.

The Shield-X decal, during angled impacts, significantly reduces rotational acceleration caused by friction. Rotational forces are thought to be the major component in concussion and its severity. It is designed to look like a conventional helmet decal.

BX-E 

BX-E is an external decal that can be applied to any helmet. It can conform to the exterior of the helmet and can be customized to sport any logo or pattern. BX-E is convenient and easy to apply. It is ideal for football teams and it can replace conventional decals.

The BX-E, was finished development in 2014 at Simon Fraser University's Head Injury Prevention Lab.

Currently, the majority of available helmet designs are made and tested only to protect the head against direct radial impacts, which cause a linear acceleration of the brain.
 However, a helmet almost always impacts an obstacle obliquely (at an angle) causing injury due to both linear and rotational acceleration of the brain. The brain tissue is six orders of magnitude or 1,000,000 times more sensitive to shear forces than to compression forces.

Through standard oblique drop tests of American football, ice hockey, bicycle and motorcycle helmets using a standard human headform, it was found that reducing the frictional force can significantly reduce the rotational acceleration experienced by the headform. BX-E was first tested during the 2014 season of Simon Fraser University's Clan Football Team. "According to the coach (Jacques Chapdelaine), the number of concussions dropped from 14 cases in 2013 to only four cases in 2014." BX-E was brought into commercial use in October 2015 after being adopted by the football teams of Handsworth Secondary School and Vernon Secondary School.

Technology 

Shield-X Technology claims the technology serves the purpose of a conventional decal (display a logo) while also including the function of an 'Impact Diverting Decal'. An 'Impact Diverting Decal' functions by reducing the magnitude of friction force applied on a helmet during an angular impact by reducing the coefficient of friction. The frictional force acts tangentially to the curvature of a helmet and is distal to the center of mass of the mass system (defined by the helmet, skull and brain) by a radius r. This results in a moment or torque around the center of mass and a rotational acceleration. This is shown in the equation below:  
 
 
r is the displacement vector (a vector from the center of mass (axis of rotation) to the point where friction force is applied),
F is the friction force vector,
× denotes the Cross product 
 
By reducing the magnitude of friction force F, torque is reduced as well as rotational acceleration of the brain. Rotational acceleration of the brain can apply shear force on brain tissue which is one of the major factors in head injuries such as concussions. The mechanism also allows the impact zone to slide along the side of a helmet. This enables the helmet to perform better by spreading the compression force. BX-E is 1 mm or 3/64 of an inch thick and is applied to the outside of a helmet. BX-E is composed of four micro-engineered layers; aerospace-grade film, a micro-layer of non-toxic medium, a highly conformable film and a solvent-free high strength adhesive.

Patent 

The patent for BX-E has a filing date of June 29, 2012 with a priority date of June 30, 2011.

BX-I  

The BX-E can be modified and embedded within a helmet to enhance its performance. 
BX-I integrates the technology with helmets from the inside, rendering itself invisible. It can be easily tailored to the contours of the helmet without any restructuring. This is ideal helmets such as bicycle, skiing or motorcycle, in which BX-I can be combined with the fit pad layer to be seamlessly integrated into the design.

BX-C  

BX-C is the first in a series of planned Shield-X wearable devices. BX-C is a cap infused with the Shield-X membrane to provide a convenient armor against the sharp twisting of the brain. BX-C has been engineered to be thin, fitting snuggly underneath a helmet. Its durable, flexible materials make it reusable and machine washable.

References

External links
 

Technology companies of Canada
Helmets